Zhefang is a town in Mangshi, Yunnan, China. The town is bordered to the north by Xishan Township, to the east by Santaishan Town and Mengga Town, to the south by Manghai Town and Myanmar, and to the west by Ruili.

Administrative division
As of December 2015, the town is divided into 13 villages: 
 Jiedao
 Humen
 Hunong
 Nongxi
 Hula
 Zhemao
 Nongkan
 Gazhong
 Hebianzhai
 Nongqiu
 Wengjiao
 Gongling
 Bangda

History
During the Republic of China (1912-1949), it was known as "Qinglong Town".

After the founding of the Communist State in 1953, "Zhefang District" was set up. 

In 1958 it was renamed "Zhefang Commune" and then "Qianwei Commune" in the following year.

In 1988, it was upgraded to a town.

In 2005, former Dongshan Township was merged into the town.

Geography
The Longchuan River and Mangshi River flow through the town.

Economy
The economy is supported primarily by agriculture and tourism. 

The rice in the town is very famous. It used to be a royal tribute.

Education
 Zhefang Central Primary School

Transport
The National Highway G320 passes across the town.

Attractions
Mangbang Yaochi Hot Spring is a famous tourist and leisure attraction.

Dongshangyun, also known as "Mangbing Pagoda", was originally built in early 17th-century and completely destroyed in the Cultural Revolution. The present version was rebuilt in 1985.

References

Divisions of Mangshi